South Devon is the southern part of the county of Devon in England.

South Devon may also refer to

 South Devon Area of Outstanding Natural Beauty
 South Devon (UK Parliament constituency)
 South Devon College
 South Devon cattle, a breed of cattle